Devario micronema, is a fish belonging to the minnow family (Cyprinidae).  It is endemic to Sri Lanka. However, the validity of the species description was noted problematic by several other local ichthyologists.

Description
Body with 3–5 irregular vertical bars on anterior half. There are 14–17 pre-dorsal scales and 10–11 branched dorsal-fin rays. Danionin notch present. Lateral line complete. There is a prominent squareshaped process on its first infraorbital. Dorsum light yellowish brown with a metallic sheen. Body silvery sheen laterally and ventrally. Vertical bars metallic blue with bright yellowish interspaces. Fins hyaline.

Ecology
It is found from well-shaded areas of shallow, slow moving streams of Kitulgala area closer to Kelani Valley Forest Reserve.

References 

Devario
Cyprinid fish of Asia
Freshwater fish of Sri Lanka
Fish described in 1863